Sulfur monoxide is an inorganic compound with formula . It is only found as a dilute gas phase.  When concentrated or condensed, it converts to S2O2 (disulfur dioxide). It has been detected in space but is rarely encountered intact otherwise.

Structure and bonding
The SO molecule has a triplet ground state similar to O2 and S2, that is, each molecule has two unpaired electrons. The S−O bond length of 148.1 pm is similar to that found in lower sulfur oxides (e.g. S8O, S−O = 148 pm) but is longer than the S−O bond in gaseous S2O (146 pm), SO2 (143.1 pm) and SO3 (142 pm).

The molecule is excited with near infrared radiation to the singlet state (with no unpaired electrons). The singlet state is believed to be more reactive than the ground triplet state, in the same way that singlet oxygen is more reactive than triplet oxygen.

Production and reactions
Production of SO as a reagent in organic syntheses has centred on using compounds that "extrude" SO. Examples include the decomposition of the relatively simple molecule ethylene episulfoxide: as well as more complex examples, such as a trisulfide oxide, C10H6S3O.

C2H4SO  → C2H4 + SO

The SO molecule is thermodynamically unstable, converting initially to S2O2. 
SO inserts into alkenes, alkynes and dienes producing thiiranes, molecules with three-membered rings containing sulfur.

Generation under extreme conditions
In the laboratory, sulfur monoxide can be produced by treating sulfur dioxide with sulfur vapor in a glow discharge. It has been detected in single-bubble sonoluminescence of concentrated sulfuric acid containing some dissolved noble gas.

Benner and Stedman developed a chemiluminescence detector for sulfur via the reaction between sulfur monoxide and ozone:
SO + O3 →  SO2* + O2
SO2* →  SO2 + hν

Occurrence

Ligand for transition metals
As a ligand SO can bond in a number different ways:
a terminal ligand, with a bent M−O−S arrangement, for example with titanium oxyfluoride
a terminal ligand, with a bent M−S−O arrangement, analogous to bent nitrosyl
bridging across two or three metal centres (via sulfur), as in Fe3(μ3-S)(μ3-SO)(CO)9
η2 sideways-on (d–π interaction) with vanadium, niobium, and tantalum.

Astrochemistry
Sulfur monoxide has been detected around Io, one of Jupiter's moons, both in the atmosphere and in the plasma torus. It has also been found in the atmosphere of Venus, in Comet Hale–Bopp, in 67P/Churyumov–Gerasimenko, and in the interstellar medium.

On Io, SO is thought to be produced both by volcanic and photochemical routes. The principal photochemical reactions are proposed as follows:
 O  +  S2  →  S  +  SO
 SO2  → SO  +  O

Sulfur monoxide has been found in NML Cygni.

Biological chemistry
Sulfur monoxide may have some biological activity. The formation of transient SO in the coronary artery of pigs has been inferred from the reaction products, carbonyl sulfide and sulfur dioxide.

Safety measures
Because of sulfur monoxide's rare occurrence in our atmosphere and poor stability, it is difficult to fully determine its hazards. But when condensed and compacted, it forms disulfur dioxide, which is relatively toxic and corrosive. This compound is also highly flammable (similar flammability to methane) and when burned produces sulfur dioxide, a poisonous gas.

Sulfur monoxide dication 
Sulfur dioxide SO2 in presence of hexamethylbenzene C6(CH3)6 can be protonated under superacidic conditions (HF·AsF5) to give the non-rigid π-complex C6(CH3)6SO2+. The SO2+ moiety can essentially move barrierless over the benzene ring. The S−O bond length is 142.4(2) pm.

 C6(CH3)6 + SO2 + 3 HF·AsF5 → [C6(CH3)6SO][AsF6]2 + [H3O][AsF6]

Disulfur dioxide 

SO converts to disulfur dioxide (S2O2). Disulfur dioxide is a planar molecule with C2v symmetry. The S−O bond length is 145.8 pm, shorter than in the monomer, and the S−S bond length is 202.45 pm. The O−S−S angle is 112.7°.  S2O2 has a dipole moment of 3.17 D.

References

Gases
Interchalcogens
Sulfur oxides
Sulfur(II) compounds
Diatomic molecules